Vintage Future is the ninth studio album by the American post-punk band The Intelligence, released on September 25, 2015 on In the Red Records. The album was produced by vocalist and guitarist Lars Finberg and former guitarist Chris Woodhouse.

The album features contributions from Finberg's former Thee Oh Sees bandmates Brigid Dawson and Petey Dammit.

Reception

In a positive review for AllMusic, Heather Phares praised the album's diversity and aesthetic: "Vintage Future is one of the Intelligence's most focused albums, and their most clever and satisfying music in some time." In another positive review for The A.V. Club, David Anthony wrote: "The record is an amalgam of classic sounds updated for the modern era. At times it’s easy to see the influence of Devo or The Stooges, but it even bares a passing resemblance to some of Denton, Texas’ garage-punk greats."

Track listing

Personnel

The Intelligence
Lars Finberg - vocals, guitar, keyboards, programmes
Dave Hernandez - guitar, vocals, keyboards
Drew Church - bass guitar
Pete Capponi - drums

Additional musicians
Chris Woodhouse - drums (7 & 10)
Brigid Dawson - backing vocals (7, 8 & 10)
K. Dylan Edrich - viola and violin (8 & 10)
Mike Donovan - backing vocals (5)
Petey Dammit - backing vocals (6)

Recording personnel
Chris Woodhouse - producer, recording, mixing
Lars Finberg - producer

Artwork
Lars Finberg - photography
Monty Buckles - airbrush
Jun Ohnuki - graphics and layout

References

2015 albums
The Intelligence albums
In the Red Records albums